Introducing Kenny Burrell: The First Blue Note Sessions is a compilation album by jazz guitarist Kenny Burrell. It compiles:
Introducing Kenny Burrell (Disc 1, #1-7)Kenny Burrell Volume 2 (Disc 1, #8-9; Disc 2 #1-4 and 6)K. B. Blues (Disc 2, #7-11) (1979, Blue Note Japan, GXF-3052)

The album also features the outtake "My Heart Stood Still", originally appeared on the hard to find Swingin (GXF-3070). All the tracks were recorded mainly at Van Gelder Studio between February and May 1956 and were produced by Alfred Lion.

Track listing
All compositions by Kenny Burrell except as indicatedDisc One "This Time the Dream's on Me" (Arlen, Mercer) - 5:00
 "Fugue 'N Blues" - 6:48
 "Takeela" - 4:19
 "Weaver of Dreams" (Elliott, Young) - 4:43
 "Delilah" (Young) - 6:04
 "Rhythmorama" (Kenny Clarke) - 6:28
 "Blues for Skeeter" - 8:08
 "Get Happy" (Arlen, Koehler) - 4:02 
 "But Not for Me" (Gershwin, Gershwin) - 3:49Disc Two "Moten Swing" (Bennie Moten) - 6:08
 "Cheetah" - 4:43
 "Now See How You Are" (Woody Harris, Oscar Pettiford) - 5:54
 "Phinupi" - 4:42
 "My Heart Stood Still" (Hart, Rodgers) - 5:13
 "How About You?" (Lane, Ralph Freed) - 5:14
 "K.B. Blues" - 6:24
 "D.B. Blues" (Young) - 5:50
 "Nica's Dream" (Horace Silver) - 9:37
 "Out for Blood" - 9:06
 "K.B. Blues" [Alternate Take] - 6:16

Disc One recorded on May 29–30, 1956;
Disc Two #1-6 on March 12, 1956; #7-11 on February 10, 1956.

PersonnelDisc OneKenny Burrell - guitar (except on #6)
Tommy Flanagan - piano (except on #6 & 9)
Paul Chambers - bass (except on #6 & 9)
Kenny Clarke - drums (except on #9)
Candido - conga  (except on #2, 4 & 9)Disc Two #1-6Kenny Burrell - guitar
Tommy Flanagan - piano
Frank Foster - tenor saxophone
Oscar Pettiford - bass
Shadow Wilson - drumsDisc Two #7-11'
Kenny Burrell - guitar
Horace Silver - piano
Hank Mobley - tenor saxophone
Doug Watkins - bass
Louis Hayes - drums

References

2000 albums
Kenny Burrell albums
Blue Note Records albums
Albums produced by Alfred Lion
Albums recorded at Van Gelder Studio